Harlech Road is a road in Hong Kong. It is high up in the Peak area of Hong Kong Island, The road starts at Victoria Gap, then goes along the south slope of Victoria Peak, then crosses High West Gap, and goes along the north slope of High West, and finally ends at the ridge of High West.

Harlech Road spans two country parks in Hong Kong, one Pok Fu Lam Country Park and the other Lung Fu Shan Country Park. The road is good for hiking.

The road was built before 1906. It meets several roads, namely Mount Austin Road, Lugard Road, Peak Road, Old Peak Road, Findlay Road and Hatton Road.

Notes

Roads on Hong Kong Island
Victoria Peak